The 2020 TNT Tropang Giga season was the 30th season of the franchise in the Philippine Basketball Association (PBA).

Draft picks

Roster

Philippine Cup

Eliminations

Standings

Game log

|-bgcolor=ccffcc
| 1
| October 11
| Alaska
| W 100–95
| Roger Pogoy (45)
| Pogoy, Erram (8)
| John Paul Erram (6)
| AUF Sports Arena & Cultural Center
| 1–0
|-bgcolor=ccffcc
| 2
| October 13
| Terrafirma
| W 112–101
| Bobby Ray Parks Jr. (40)
| Troy Rosario (15)
| Rosario, Parks (5)
| AUF Sports Arena & Cultural Center
| 2–0
|-bgcolor=ccffcc
| 3
| October 16
| San Miguel
| W 107–88
| John Paul Erram (27)
| John Paul Erram (15)
| Jayson Castro (11)
| AUF Sports Arena & Cultural Center
| 3–0
|-bgcolor=ccffcc
| 4
| October 19
| Phoenix
| W 110–91
| Roger Pogoy (30)
| John Paul Erram (15)
| Castro, Parks (5)
| AUF Sports Arena & Cultural Center
| 4–0
|-bgcolor=ccffcc
| 5
| October 22
| Blackwater
| W 109–96
| Roger Pogoy (20)
| Troy Rosario (12)
| Erram, Parks (5)
| AUF Sports Arena & Cultural Center
| 5–0
|-bgcolor=ccffcc
| 6
| NLEX Road Warriors
| L 98–109
| Jayson Castro (27)
| Troy Rosario (12)
| Jayson Castro (8)
| AUF Sports Arena & Cultural Center
| 5–1

References

TNT Tropang Giga
TNT Tropang Giga seasons